Xuan is the Mandarin pinyin romanization of the rare Chinese surname written  as a Chinese character. It is romanized Hsüan in Wade–Giles. It is not among the top 300 most common Chinese surnames.

Notable people
 Xuan Zeng (宣缯); fl. early 13th century), high minister of the Southern Song dynasty
 Xuan Xiafu (宣侠父; 1899–1938), Communist agent assassinated by the KMT
 Xuan Jinglin (宣景琳; 1907–1992), actress
 Hsuan Ming-chih (宣明智; born 1952), former general manager of UMC
 Jessica Hsuan or Xuan Xuan (born 1970), Hong Kong actress
 Xuan Zan, fictional character in the classical novel Water Margin

References

Chinese-language surnames
Individual Chinese surnames